Phyllonorycter cerisolella is a moth of the family Gracillariidae. It is known from France.

The larvae feed on Sorbus species. They mine the leaves of their host plant. They create an upper-surface tentiform mine.

References

cerisolella
Moths of Europe
Moths described in 1872